Charles Gildon (c. 1665 – 1 January 1724), was an English hack writer who was, by turns, a translator, biographer, essayist, playwright, poet, author of fictional letters, fabulist, short story author, and critic.  He provided the source for many lives of Restoration figures, although he appears to have propagated or invented numerous errors with them.  He is remembered best as a target of Alexander Pope's in both Dunciad and the Epistle to Dr. Arbuthnot and an enemy of Jonathan Swift's.  Gildon's biographies are, in many cases, the only biographies available, but they have nearly without exception been shown to have wholesale invention in them.  Because of Pope's caricature of Gildon, but also because of the sheer volume and rapidity of his writings, Gildon has come to stand as the epitome of the hired pen and the literary opportunist.

Biography

Gildon was born in Gillingham, Dorset to a Roman Catholic family that had been active in support of the Royalist side during the English Civil War.  While one of Charles's cousins, Joseph, would become a Catholic priest, Charles's parents fled to France, and Charles was educated at Douai.  He left college without ordination and moved to England in 1684, at the age of 19.  Two years later, he moved to London, where he immediately spent or lost his patrimony.  Two years after that, in 1688, he married a woman without money.  He almost immediately turned to writing as a method of getting money.

His first known literary employer was John Dunton, who used Gildon for the Athenian Mercury (see Restoration literature for a discussion of this periodical) and to write The History of the Athenian Society in 1692.  In the same year, Gildon wrote a biography of Aphra Behn, claiming to have been a close friend of hers.  Inasmuch as he and Behn were both probably from Dorset and royalists (although only Gildon's family had been active during the Interregnum, whereas Behn was probably a Cavalier spy), it is possible that Gildon did know and seek out Behn, but his account of her life has many demonstrable errors in it (including a wholly credulous reading of Oroonoko).  At the time, however, he was a social correspondent with John Dryden and William Wycherley, as well as Behn, and he lived a courtly lifestyle.  He was a Deist around 1693–1698, and Daniel Defoe attacked him as a rake who had six well-fed whores and a starving wife.  Gildon edited the Works of Charles Blount in 1693 and added his own Deist tract, Oracles of Reason, to the edition.  In 1695, he produced a Life of Blount that made his subject heroic.  At the same time, he wrote a defense of Dryden's modernism against Thomas Rymer in 1694.

Between 1696 and 1702, Gildon wrote four blank verse tragedies that failed.  He also converted to Anglicanism in 1698 and wrote, later, The Deist's Manual (1705), to attack Deism.  He also produced a series of tales, including "The Post-Boy Robb'd of his Mail", "The Golden Spy," and "All for the Better" between 1692 and 1720.

Gildon's The Golden Spy (1709) has been regarded by modern scholars as "the first, fully-fledged it-narrative in English". But for his contemporaries, it tends to be read as "a Menippean satire, a re-adaptation of Apuleius's The Golden Ass and a sequel to The New Metamorphosis [i.e. Gildon's adaptation of The Golden Ass in 1708]".

In 1706, Gildon, a staunch Whig by this point (in contrast to his family's Toryism and Jacobitism), published letters to the Electress Sophia to come visit England, with an eye toward being on hand to take the throne upon Queen Anne's death.  The government prosecuted him for seditious libel.  Prominent Whigs came to his aid, and Richard Steele wrote his appeal.  When Gildon was found guilty and fined 100 pounds, Arthur Mainwaring paid the fine for him.  The letters were sufficient provocation to carry a prison term or the pillory, but Gildon's connections saved him.

Arthur Mainwaring, an enemy already of Jonathan Swift's, aided Gildon again, and Steele introduced him to other periodical work.  Gildon's 1710 Life of Thomas Betterton was dedicated to Steele in return.

Gildon's essay on "The Art of Poetry" was published anonymously in John Brightland's A Grammar of the English Tongue, which was first published in 1711; Gildon later expanded this essay into his book The Complete Art of Poetry in 1718. Brightland's Grammar also included Gildon's treatise on "Logic; or, The Art of Reasoning". Gildon's "Logic" is an unattributed translation of a large part of Jean Le Clerc's Logica of 1692. Much of Gildon's translation of Le Clerc was appropriated by Ephraim Chambers when Chambers composed his Cyclopaedia.

In 1711, John Brightland hired Gildon to run The British Mercury.  For six months, Gildon conducted a series of attacks on Jonathan Swift and Alexander Pope.  He attacked Swift for Swift's enmity with Mainwaring, and his quarrel with Pope was probably similarly political.  After The British Mercury folded, he launched another attack on Pope in a play called A New Rehearsal (1714) and in the body of Memoirs of the Life of William Wycherley (one of Pope's mentors) in 1718.  Also in 1718, Gildon switched literary sides in Complete Art of Poetry, which he dedicated to the Duchess of Buckingham.  In it, he reiterated Rymer's dicta of neo-classicism, which he had disapproved of earlier in his career, with Dryden.

By 1719, Gildon was blind and in great poverty.  Alexander Pope suggested, in his correspondence, that the blindness was due to syphilis.  However, Gildon was in danger of starvation.  In 1721, the Duchess of Buckingham gave him some relief.  The same year, Robert Harley (patron and friend to Swift and Pope, earlier) gave him a 100-pound annuity as a "Royal Bounty."  On 12 December 1723, a benefit of Thomas Southerne's Oroonoko was probably intended for him.

Gildon is also involved with the biographies of women writers. He is assumed to be the biographer who masqueraded as "One of the Fair Sex" of Memoirs on the Life of Mrs. Behn which appears at the beginning of the first edition of The Histories and Novels or the Late Ingenious Mrs. Behn (1696). Gildon wrote two sheets of Mrs. Manley's life under the title of The History of Rivella, Author of the Atalantis, probably in a negative light. Delarivier Manley persuaded the publisher Edmund Curll to defer the publication; soon Manley met and reconciled with Gildon to suppress his materials. Then Manley wrote her own version of history under strict time constraints and published it anonymously under the title The Adventures of Rivella (1714).

He also published the pamphlet titled The Life and Strange Surprizing Adventures of Mr. D–––  De F    , of London, Hosier (1719) just after The Farther Adventures of Robinson Crusoe. This humorous pamphlet includes the dialogue between Defoe and his characters Robinson Crusoe and Friday, in which Gildon exposes narrative inconsistencies in the novel. In the ending of this pamphlet, Crusoe and Friday made Defoe swallow his own big books as a punishment for his unfair depiction of characters, saying "if you will make such large Compositions, you must take them for your Pains". Daniel Defoe defends himself against Gildon's attacks in his preface to the Serious Reflections, the final sequel to Robinson Crusoe.

He died in London on 1 January 1724.

References

Sambrook, James.  In, Matthew, H.C.G. and Brian Harrison, eds.  The Oxford Dictionary of National Biography.  vol. 22, 225–6.  London: Oxford UP, 2004. Price for the whole ONDB set of 60+ volumes is currently $2660. Otherwise, an online subscription is required to read this work. The following reference is somewhat more accessible:
 Leslie Stephen, "Gildon, Charles", in John Stevens and Sidney Lee, eds., The Dictionary of National Biography (1908), vol. 7, p. 1226.

1665 births
1724 deaths
Converts to Anglicanism from Roman Catholicism
English biographers
People from Gillingham, Dorset
Fabulists
17th-century English writers
17th-century English male writers
18th-century English writers
18th-century English male writers